Music from the Motion Picture Soundtrack Brown Sugar is the soundtrack to Rick Famuyiwa's 2002 film Brown Sugar. It was released on September 24, 2002 through MCA Records, and consists of hip hop and R&B music. The album peaked at number 16 on the Billboard 200, at number 2 on the Top R&B/Hip-Hop Albums, at number 1 on the Top Soundtracks, and was placed at number 40 on Pitchfork's the 50 Best Movie Soundtracks of All Time.

The album spawned Erykah Badu and Common's successful single "Love of My Life (An Ode to Hip-Hop)", which made it to number 9 on the Billboard Hot 100, number 1 on the Hot R&B/Hip-Hop Singles & Tracks, and won a Grammy Award for Best R&B Song.

Track listing

Chart history

Weekly charts

Year-end charts

References

External links

2002 soundtrack albums
Hip hop soundtracks
MCA Records soundtracks
Contemporary R&B soundtracks
Albums produced by Hi-Tek
Albums produced by Eric B.
Albums produced by Kanye West
Albums produced by Dre & Vidal
Albums produced by Missy Elliott
Albums produced by Raphael Saadiq
Comedy film soundtracks
Romance film soundtracks